Testis expressed 15 is a protein that in humans is encoded by the TEX15 gene.

The TEX15 gene displays testis-specific expression, maps to chromosome 8, contains four exons and encodes a 2789-amino acid protein.  The TEX15 gene encodes a DNA damage response factor important in meiosis.

Animal studies 

In mice, disruption of an ortholog of the TEX15 gene caused a drastic reduction in testis size and meiotic arrest in males.  TEX15, in mice, is required for chromosome synapsis, meiotic recombination and DNA double-strand break repair.  Furthermore, TEX15 regulates the loading of recombination proteins (RAD51 and DMC1) onto sites of DNA double-strand breaks, and its absence causes a failure of meiotic recombination.

Clinical significance 

A mutation in the TEX15 gene was found to be associated with male infertility and meiotic maturation arrest.

Truncation variants of TEX15 are also potential breast cancer risk factors.

References

Further reading 

 

Human proteins